Keoti Falls  (also spelt Kevti) is in Rewa district in the Indian state of Madhya Pradesh. It is the 24th highest waterfall in India.

The Falls
The Keoti Falls is on the Mahana river, a tributary of Tamsa or Tons River as it comes down from the Rewa Plateau. It is a segmented type waterfall with a single drop.

Knick point, also called a nick point or simply nick, represents breaks in slopes in the longitudinal profile of a river caused by rejuvenation. The break in channel gradient allows water to fall vertically giving rise to a waterfall. Keoti Falls is an example of a nick point caused by rejuvenation.

Location

See also
List of waterfalls in India
List of waterfalls in India by height

References

Waterfalls of Madhya Pradesh
Tourist attractions in Rewa district